Maredsous is a semi-hard loaf-shaped washed-rind cheese made from cow's milk.  It is suitable for slicing, and characterised by an orange coloured rind.  The cheese has been produced at Maredsous Abbey in Belgium since 1953.   

The cheese is lightly pressed, then washed in brine to create the firm, orange crust and pungent aroma.  Each cheese is washed by hand every two days, starting with the older cheeses.  The water used for the washing of the older cheeses picks up the appropriate bacteria which are then transferred to the younger cheeses when the same water is used for washing these. The maturing process in the cellar takes place over 22 days.

Maredsous is now an industrially produced cheese, produced by Groupe Bel. The only cheeses still manufactured at the abbey are in the traditional sizes of 390g, 800g and 2.5kg.

The abbey currently makes seven varieties: Maredsous Tradition, Mi-Vieux (half old), Fumé (smoked), Fondu (fondue), Frais (the fresh cheese), Light, and Fagotin.

See also

References

Cow's-milk cheeses
Belgian cheeses
Walloon culture
Namur (province)